Michael Hentley was the Administrator for the British overseas territory of Tristan da Cunha, which is situated in the South Atlantic Ocean. He reported to Michael Clancy, who was the Governor, and was based in Saint Helena.

As the administrator, Hentley was head of government and acted in accordance with advice from Tristan da Cunha's Island Council which is composed of eight elected and three appointed members.

Hentley lived on Tristan da Cunha from May 2004 with his wife Janis  until he left the island on 13 September 2007, the day his responsibility ended and the new Administrator's began.

On 12 September 2007, a party in the Prince Philip Hall was held by Hentley to welcome his successor, David Morley who had arrived on the S. A. Agulhas that day. The next day Hentley left for Gough Island on the very same ship.

See also

Administrator of Tristan da Cunha

References

Administrators of Tristan da Cunha
British diplomats
Living people
Year of birth missing (living people)